Ciorescu, formerly known  as Cricova Nouǎ (Romanian; , Novoye Krikovo), is a commune in Moldova, located  in the north-east of Chişinău, the capital of Moldova. The commune is part of the Rîșcani sector of the Chișinău municipality. It is composed of three villages: Ciorescu, Făurești and Goian.

Sports
The commune hosted the Basketball 2016 FIBA European Championship for Small Countries, which took place 28 June – 3 July.

References

External links
 "Informaţii despre Ciorescu" at the Chişinău City Hall site

Communes of Chișinău Municipality